Evangelical Baptist Seminary of Quebec or Séminaire Baptiste Évangélique du Québec (SEMBEQ), is a French-language Baptist theological training school headquartered in Montreal, Quebec (Canada).  Established in 1974, it employs a church-based model for training pastors and lay persons to serve in their local churches.

History 
SEMBEQ was founded in 1974 by the Association of Evangelical Baptist Churches of Quebec (AEBEQ, Association d'Églises baptistes évangéliques au Québec).  The seminary was started by William (Bill) Phillips, Elisée Beau, and Jacques Alexanian in order to meet the need within Quebec to train local Baptist pastors (at the time, most theological education in Quebec was strictly Catholic). Sixty-five student registered for the first official course, The Gospel of Mark.  By the school year of 1980–1981, the seminary offered 7 courses, attended by 130 students from 17 churches.  In 1984, SEMBEQ awarded its first bachelor's degree, with a master program starting in 1990.

Mission & Services 
SEMBEQ "exists to equip local churches for the training of their leaders."  Beginning in 2014, the seminary has a 10-year "strategic vision" to train 200 ministry workers, 200 elders, and 200 women.

SEMBEQ offers classes in theology, Bible, and ministry practices (such as counseling and church leadership). Most courses are offered within local evangelical churches, in order to facilitate the practical emphasis of the instruction. SEMBEQ also offers a publishing service to facilitate the printing of French-language theology and ministry materials. SEMBEQ Magazine is published quarterly, with the first edition appearing in the summer of 2015.

Affiliations

AEBEQ/Fellowship of Evangelical Baptist Churches in Canada 
SEMBEQ is affiliated with the Association of Evangelical Baptist Churches in Québec (AEBEQ), a group of churches in Quebec and neighbouring Ontario and New Brunswick. SEMBEQ and AEBEQ are affiliated with the Fellowship of Evangelical Baptist Churches in Canada.

Mission Quebec 
SEMBEQ is affiliated with Mission Quebec, an organization that has a mission to strengthen and equip churches, as well as plant new churches and share the gospel. SEMBEQ and Mission Quebec work closely together, with the shared goal of training missionaries who can share the gospel in the province.

Northwest Seminary 
SEMBEQ has recently entered into a partnership with Northwest Baptist Seminary in order to offer the training program Immerse to leaders of Quebecois churches.

Values 
SEMBEQ offers a holistic program that trains students in three domains:

Knowledge 
The student will obtain a better knowledge of God, His Word, the nature of the church and of its mission, as well as intellectual and doctrinal growth.

Character 
The student will experience growth in his or her personal character, helping him or her to cultivate good spiritual habits, to watch over his or her own person before God, his or her family, and his or her church.

Competency 
The student will develop the essential competencies in order to uplift the church, so that he or she may become an experienced worker in evangelism and disciple-making.

Logo 
SEMBEQ's logo is symbolic on several levels. The four ends of the cross in the centre represent sharing the gospel unto the four corners of the earth, resonating with SEMBEQs mission to multiply church leaders. There is a fleur de lis at each end, which, in addition to adding Quebecois character, also represents faith and wisdom in heraldry.

The open book with the light coming from it represents the good news that needs to be shared. In the book's binding is the shape of a house, which calls seminary students back to their local churches. The entire logo is the shape of a university crest, which symbolizes the history of SEMBEQ and its vision for future training.

References

External links 
 

Baptist seminaries and theological colleges in Canada
Universities and colleges in Quebec
Education in Montreal
Educational institutions established in 1974